Christoph Hein (born 8 April 1944) is a German author and translator.
He grew up in the village Bad Düben near Leipzig. Being a clergyman's son and thus not allowed to attend the Erweiterte Oberschule in the GDR, he received secondary education at a gymnasium in the western part of Berlin. After his Abitur he jobbed inter alia as assembler, bookseller and assistant director. From 1967 to 1971 Hein studied philosophy in Leipzig and Berlin. Upon graduation he became dramatic adviser at the Volksbühne in Berlin, where he worked as a resident writer from 1974. Since 1979 Hein has worked as a freelance writer.

Hein first became known for his 1982 novella Der fremde Freund (The Distant Lover).
From 1998 to 2000 Hein was the first president of the pan-German PEN-Centre.

According to Hein, the acclaimed film drama The Lives of Others is loosely based on his life story. In a 2019 article, he claims that after attending the premiere screening, he asked author and director von Donnersmarck to have his name removed from the credits, because he felt that the movie was a ""scary tale taking place in a fantasy land, comparable to Tolkien's Middle-earth," that "does not depict the 1980s in the GDR".

Awards 
Source:

 1982: Heinrich Mann Prize of the Akademie der Künste der DDR
 1983: Deutscher Kritikerpreis
 1986: Mara-Cassens-Preis des Hamburger Literaturhauses für den Ersten Roman
 1989: Stefan-Andres-Preis (Stadt Schweich an der Mosel)
 1989: Lessing-Preis der DDR (Ministerium für Kultur)
 1990: Erich Fried Prize (Wien)
 1992: Ludwig-Mülheims-Theaterpreis für religiöse Dramatik
 1992: Berliner Literaturpreis of the Stiftung Preußische Seehandlung
 1994: Großes Bundesverdienstkreuz (5. Oktober 1994)
 1998: Peter-Weiss-Preis of the city of Bochum
 2000: Solothurner Literaturpreis
 2000: Zonser Hörspielpreis
 2002: Brüder-Grimm-Professur
 2002: Österreichischer Staatspreis für Europäische Literatur
 2003: Calwer Hermann-Hesse-Stipendium
 2004: Schiller-Gedächtnispreis des Landes Baden-Württemberg
 2004: Ver.di-Literaturpreis Berlin-Brandenburg
 2008: Walter-Hasenclever-Literaturpreis
 2010: Eichendorff-Literaturpreis
 2011: Gerty-Spies-Literaturpreis
 2011: Honorary citizenship of Bad Düben
 2012: Uwe Johnson Prize
 2013: International Stefan Heym Prize
 2017: Grimmelshausen-Preis for Glückskind mit Vater
 2020: Kinderbuchpreis des Landes Nordrhein-Westfalen (together illustrator Rotraut Susanne Berner) for Alles was Du brauchst – Die 20 wichtigsten Dinge im Leben

Works
Die Witwe des Maurers (1980)
Frank, eine Kindheit mit Vätern (narrative, 1980)
Einladung zum Lever Bourgeois (narratives, 1980)
Cromwell und andere Stücke (plays, 1981)
Der fremde Freund (novella, 1982, in Western Germany: Drachenblut, English translation The Distant Lover)
Die wahre Geschichte des Ah Q (play, 1982)
Das Wildpferd unterm Kachelofen (children's book, 1984)
Horns Ende (novel, 1985)Schlötel oder Was solls (play, 1986)Öffentlich arbeiten (essays and interviews, 1987)Passage – ein Kammerspiel in drei Akten (play, 1987)Die Ritter der Tafelrunde (play, 1989)Der Tangospieler (narrative, 1989, English translation The Tango Player)Als Kind habe ich Stalin gesehen (essays and speeches, 1990)Das Napoleon-Spiel (novel, 1993)Exekution eines Kalbes und andere Erzählungen (narratives, 1994)Randow – eine Komödie (play, 1994)Von allem Anfang an (autobiography, 1997)Willenbrock (novel, 2000, made into a movie in 2005, English translation Willenbrock)Mama ist gegangen (children's novel, 2003)Landnahme (novel, 2004, English translation "Settlement" to be published November 2008)In seiner frühen Kindheit ein Garten (novel, 2005)Frau Paula Trousseau (novel 2007)Über die Schädlichkeit des Tabaks. Rede an die Abiturienten des Jahrgangs 2009''

References

External links

1944 births
Living people
People from Ziębice
People from the Province of Lower Silesia
East German writers
German male writers
Aufstehen
Members of the Academy of Arts, Berlin
Heinrich Mann Prize winners
Schiller Memorial Prize winners
Commanders Crosses of the Order of Merit of the Federal Republic of Germany